Demuynck is a surname. Notable people with the surname include:

Christian Demuynck (born 1947), member of the Senate of France
Daniel Demuynck, a known name of Clark Olofsson (born 1947), Swedish criminal later living in Belgium
Jourdan DeMuynck (born 1990), American basketball player
Karel Demuynck, (born 1965), former Belgian professional tennis player
Lucien De Muynck, (1 August 1931 – 24 October 1999), Belgian middle distance runner